Racquel Seruca (1962 – 29 May 2022) was a Portuguese oncobiologist known for her work on stomach cancer.

Life 
Seruca was born and raised in Porto. She graduated in medicine at the University of Porto before obtaining a PhD in the molecular genetics of stomach cancer in 1995. She was supervised by Professor . She was then a fellow at the University of Groningen in the Human Genetics department.

Seruca and Joana Paredes led a team that obtained funding three times from the charity No Stomach For Cancer in 2015, 2017 and 2021 for their research work to create tests to identify mutations in the Caderin-E gene that is responsible for inherited stomach cancer.

She died in Porto in 2022.

Awards and recognition 
She was decorated by the Portuguese government with the insignia of Grand Officer of the Order of Infante D. Henrique, in 2009, for her contribution to the study of stomach cancer. She was awarded the Benjamin Castelman Award (USCAP) in 2001 and 2012. She received the Medal of Scientific Merit from the Porto City Council in 2014. In the same year, she was awarded the Femina Award for Merit in Science. In 2021, she won the ACTIVA Women Inspiring Science Award for her contribution to the Comprehensive Cancer Center.

References

External links 
 video

1962 births
2022 deaths
Women medical researchers
Portuguese medical researchers
People from Porto
20th-century Portuguese women scientists
20th-century Portuguese scientists
21st-century Portuguese women scientists
21st-century Portuguese scientists
Oncologists
Women oncologists
University of Porto alumni